The Hungarian Rhapsodies, S.244, R.106, are a set of 19 piano pieces based on Hungarian folk themes, composed by Franz Liszt during 1846–1853, and later in 1882 and 1885. Liszt also arranged versions for orchestra, piano duet and piano trio.

Some are better known than others, with Hungarian Rhapsody No. 2 being particularly famous and No. 6, No. 10, No. 12 and No. 14 (especially as arranged for piano and orchestra as the Hungarian Fantasy) also being well known.

In their original piano form, the Hungarian Rhapsodies are noted for their difficulty (Liszt was a virtuoso pianist as well as a composer).

Form
Liszt incorporated many themes he had heard in his native western Hungary and which he believed to be folk music, though many were in fact tunes written by members of the Hungarian upper middle class, or by composers such as József Kossovits, often played by Roma (Gypsy) bands. The large scale structure of each was influenced by the verbunkos, a Hungarian dance in several parts, each with a different tempo. Within this structure, Liszt preserved the two main structural elements of typical Gypsy improvisation—the lassan ("slow") and the friska ("fast"). At the same time, Liszt incorporated a number of effects unique to the sound of Gypsy bands, especially the pianistic equivalent of the cimbalom. He also makes much use of the Hungarian gypsy scale.

Arranged versions
Nos. 2, 5, 6, 9, 12, and 14 were arranged for orchestra by Franz Doppler, with revisions by Liszt himself. These orchestrations appear as S.359 in the Searle catalogue; however, the numbers given to these versions were different from their original numbers. The orchestral rhapsodies numbered 1–6 correspond to the piano solo versions numbered 14, 2, 6, 12, 5 and 9 respectively.

In 1874, Liszt also arranged the same six rhapsodies for piano duet (S.621). In 1882 he made a piano duet arrangement of No. 16 (S.622), and in 1885 a piano duet version of No. 18 (S.623) and No. 19 (S.623a). Liszt also arranged No. 12 (S.379a) and No. 9 (S.379) for piano, violin and cello.

No. 14 was also the basis of Liszt's Hungarian Fantasia for piano and orchestra, S.123.

List of the Hungarian Rhapsodies
The set is as follows:

The first two were published in the year 1851, nos. 3–15 in 1853, and the last four were published in 1882 and 1886.

References

Bibliography
 
 Sony Classical Records, Horowitz Plays Rachmaninov and Liszt (Sony Music Entertainment (France) Inc., 2003). SMK90447 0904472001

External links 
 

 
1853 compositions
1882 compositions
1885 compositions
Compositions set in Hungary